Arthur Walter Atkins (21 February 1925 – 7 January 1988) was an English professional footballer who played as a centre half. Born in Tokyo, his parents having business in Japan, he was educated in Erdington, Birmingham, where he was spotted by Second Division club Birmingham City. He played more than 100 games for the club in all competitions, and played a big part in the club reaching the 1950–51 FA Cup semifinal. He later played for Shrewsbury Town. He died at Good Hope Hospital in Sutton Coldfield, Warwickshire aged 62.

References

1925 births
1988 deaths
Footballers from Birmingham, West Midlands
English footballers
Association football central defenders
Birmingham City F.C. players
Shrewsbury Town F.C. players
English Football League players
Association football people from Tokyo
Paget Rangers F.C. players